The Price–Legg Bridge is a bridge over the Little River along the Lincoln–Columbia county line southeast of Lincolnton, in the U.S. state of Georgia. It carries SR 47.

A project to replace the original bridge, which was deemed "structurally deficient" was scheduled to be completed in April 2016. There is no indication as to whether the new bridge will retain the "Price–Legg Bridge" name.

History

The bridge first opened in 1952, it was named after Homer Legg, a judge in Lincoln County and J.M. Price, who was a manager of a gristmill in the area. On September, 2011, the Georgia Department of Transportation reported plans to replace the bridge in 2014 in favor of a newer one. The new bridge would be placed  from the existing bridge.

Dimensions

Replacement plans
In the early part of the 21st century, the bridge, which is the only direct land-based connection between Columbia and Lincoln counties, was determined to have experienced deterioration due to meteorological conditions and heavy traffic loads. At that time, it was discovered to be "structurally deficient". However, the bridge was not found to be in danger of collapse; just that cracks were found during inspection. In 2014, the bridge's condition was revamped to only be "functionally obsolete". The replacement project has been tallied at a $24.1 million price tag. The new bridge was scheduled to be completed by August 21, 2016. As of February 24, 2015, construction was 18 percent complete.

A study that was conducted by the United States Army Corps of Engineers determined that the project would not have a significant effect on recreation activities. However, bank fishing would be hampered.

In February 2013, a GDOT report classified the old bridge as "fracture critical". This was after some boats that were too tall for its  overhead clearance collided with the bridge. These collisions left only one bolt holding a torn connection plate in place. The bridge has been inspected on a regular basis. Traffic has been reduced from two lanes to one, from 7 a.m. to 5 p.m. to work on the new bridge The lane closures were expected to last about three months.

Four foundational piers have been built. The new bridge is planned to have two travel lanes, two emergency lanes, and a  vertical clearance. This is compared to the current bridge's . The new bridge is planned to be built only about a few hundred feet from the old one, and on the southwest side, nearer the Little River than Clarks Hill Lake.

The old bridge was scheduled to be demolished when the new one is completed.

See also
 
 
 
 Central Savannah River Area

References

Road bridges in Georgia (U.S. state)
Buildings and structures in Lincoln County, Georgia
Buildings and structures in Columbia County, Georgia
Transportation in Lincoln County, Georgia
Transportation in Columbia County, Georgia
Monuments and memorials in Georgia (U.S. state)
Bridges completed in 1952
1952 establishments in Georgia (U.S. state)